ACP Rail International, a division of ACP Marketing, markets and distributes international rail products to travel agents, tour operators and consumers. It is best known for being the exclusive global BritRail ticket distributor and a global sales agent for Eurail.

History
Since 1994, ACP Rail International has been a specialist marketing company serving continental European, British and other world railways through distribution, sales, strategy and marketing.

In 2000, the Association of Train Operating Companies (ATOC), which brings together all of Britain's national rail train companies, appointed ACP Rail to be the official distributor for BritRail and ACP Rail continues to do so.

The current headquarters of ACP Marketing is in Montreal, Canada and there is a regional office in London, England. The sales force is based in North America, Europe and Asia Pacific.

References

External links
 

Passenger rail transport
Companies based in Montreal